João Inácio Ribeiro Roma Neto (born in Recife) is a Brazilian politician currently serving as the as Minister of Citizenship in the administration of President Jair Bolsonaro since February 2021 replacing Onyx Lorenzoni.

References

1972 births
Living people
Politicians from Recife
Government ministers of Brazil